The Cathedral of the Sacred Heart or just Pretoria Catholic Cathedral is a religious building belonging to the Catholic Church and is located in the Bosman street of the town of Pretoria, in Gauteng province in South Africa.

The cathedral was built in 1877 in the Gothic architectural style, follows the Roman or Latin rite and serves as headquarters of the Metropolitan Archdiocese of Pretoria (Archidioecesis Praetoriensis) which was created in 1951 by the  bull Suprema Nobis of Pope Pius XII. It has the dignity of cathedral since 1948.

See also
Roman Catholicism in South Africa
Sacred Heart Cathedral (disambiguation)

References

Churches in Pretoria
Roman Catholic cathedrals in South Africa
Roman Catholic churches completed in 1877
Roman Catholic Archdiocese of Pretoria
19th-century Roman Catholic church buildings in South Africa
1877 establishments in the South African Republic
19th-century religious buildings and structures in South Africa